Godogodo is a district as well as a town in Jema'a Local Government Area in southern Kaduna state in the Middle Belt region of Nigeria. It is also the Godogodo Chiefdom headquarters (of the Nindem people). The town has a post office, with a postal code 801. It also houses an old tin mining tunnel site.

References

External links

Populated places in Kaduna State